Jim Furlong (born March 24, 1938, in Edmonton, Alberta) is a former professional Canadian football outside linebacker and punter who played thirteen seasons for the Calgary Stampeders of the Canadian Football League from 1962 to 1974.

College football
Jim Furlong played college football at the University of Tulsa.

Calgary
Jim Furlong played outside linebacker and punter for the Calgary Stampeders  throughout his 13-year career from 1962 to 1974. Furlong was a part of the Stampeders' 1971 Grey Cup championship team which defeated Toronto,. Furlong was also a member of the team that played in the 56th Grey Cup of 1968 and the 58th Grey Cup of 1970, losing to the Ottawa Rough Riders and to the Montreal Alouettes.

References

1940 births
Living people
Canadian football people from Winnipeg
Canadian players of American football
American football punters
Tulsa Golden Hurricane football players
Players of Canadian football from Manitoba
Canadian football linebackers
Canadian football punters
Calgary Stampeders players